The InterRegio is a train service seen in some European countries. Mostly they are trains that run "from region to region", as best described by Swiss Federal Railways.

Belgium
In Belgium, InterRegio (IR) trains were slower than the fast IC trains, and usually called at more stations along a route. Their journey was usually not as long as IC trains, but still traveled further than the local (L) trains.

Most IR trains had hourly frequencies, some having only services every two hours (although this is mostly true only for weekend services).

All trains in Belgium shared the same cost structure, so taking an IR train cost the same as an IC or L train for the same route. The only difference lay in the number of station stops they called at.

In December 2014 the InterRegio was withdrawn, InterRegio lines were either converted to InterCity or local train or cancelled completely.

Switzerland

They replaced some of the former fast trains with their own identity (InterRegio).

InterRegio trains are now very commonplace in Switzerland. The abbreviation is IR in a 45°-edgy font, white letters on red.

The ICN runs as an InterCity train but sometimes with halt frequencies in the same manner as an IR (Geneva/Lausanne-St. Gallen/Basel route) and sometimes as IC trains (Basel-Chiasso). When ICN services first began on May 28, 2000, the ICN was placed as an InterRegio train.

Germany
InterRegio trains were also commonplace in Germany from 1988 to 2003. They travelled and mainly connected regions in Germany. Most of the InterRegio lines have been replaced by InterCity lines; a few were replaced by the newly established Interregio-Express (IRE) type. However, Interregio-Express lines belong technically to the short distance train category, and tend to be shorter. InterRegio trains were very popular as they could be used without supplement - DB scrapped them, hoping customers would trade up to InterCity (IC) or Intercity Express (ICE) trains, a policy that was only partially successful, and then only when the SparPreis brand of tickets were introduced.

Denmark
The InterRegio system was also introduced to the Danish railways in the early 1990s and became an alternative to the InterCity services, with no seat reservation required.
However, unlike other countries, InterRegio trains in Denmark only operates on Fridays and Sundays, to support the heavy flow of passengers that travel on those days. These InterRegio services also have fewer stops than the InterCity services, which goes against the original InterRegio concept of long-distance trains with more local stops.
There are no specific rules for the composition for these trains, and both old and new material has been used for InterRegio services.

Poland

The fare is similar as TLK-branded fast trains of PKP Intercity.

In the beginning these trains operated mostly on Fridays and Sundays along the routes: Wrocław-Kraków, Kraków-Przemyśl, Poznań-Olsztyn, Poznań-Warsaw and Bydgoszcz-Warsaw. Since June 2009 there are more interREGIO trains on routes; most of them are available through the whole week, some of them only on weekends. More routes were introduced, some of which are especially made for students, like Kielce-Częstochowa-Wrocław.

InterREGIO in Poland mostly uses older electric multiple units (usually ED72, EN71 and EN57), with newer units on some routes (ED73 and ED59 between Warsaw and Łódź, 14WE between Kraków and Warsaw). Some IR trains are serviced with single- and/or double-decker cars and locomotives.

, all IR trains in Poland are second class-only, even though PR's regulations include a first-class fare for interREGIO trains and in service are first-class coaches, yet declassified.

Since September 1, 2015 IR trains are only on routes Łódź – Warszawa and Ełk – Grodno (Belarus), due to company's economics and restructuring. The rest were withdrawn or replaced by Twoje Linie Kolejowe express trains.

Szczekociny rail crash

On 3 March 2012, the Szczekociny train collision occurred, with 15 deaths and 50 injured

Hungary

InterRégió trains run mainly on regional lines, but their function is national as well. The trains operate along the lines Sárbogárd–Szekszárd–Baja and Kecskemét–Baja–Dombóvár. InterRégió trains use air-conditioned MÁV 6341 DMU-s which were built by the Russian Metrovagonmash.

See also
 Train categories in Europe

References

 

Passenger rail transport in Switzerland
Passenger rail transport in Poland
Rail transport in Europe